The Eames Aluminum Group series is a line of furniture designed by the office of Charles and Ray Eames for Herman Miller in 1958. It is an icon of office furniture and a "high-status symbol of modern design".

History 
The chair was originally commissioned as outdoor seating for the home of J. Irwin Miller (founder of Cummins Engines) by Eero Saarinen and Alexander Girard. The original design featured a woven suspension back and seat stretched between aluminum ribs. The aluminum elements are produced by sand casting.

It was designed by Charles Eames, Ray Eames, and Don Albinson; Charles and Don patented the design and innovative construction. Robert Staples also worked on it. Although it was originally called the "Indoor-Outdoor Group", it did not succeed as outdoor furniture, and by 1959, Herman Miller had renamed it the Eames Aluminum Group.

The chair has been in production by Herman Miller since its inception in 1958, although details have changed over time. The original seat material was a mesh, which was quickly discontinued, with the most iconic version being black leather. In 1969, the Eames added a "Soft Pad" version with cushions. In 2001, a version with "Cygnus" mesh (similar to the Aeron chair's Pellicle) was introduced. The pedestal base design has had several variants: 4 legs with floor glides, redesigned 4 legs with glides or castors; 5 legs with glides or casters. The current workplace versions use the 5-leg configuration.

Variants 
, it is produced in multiple formats: the management chair (34–37" high), the side chair (same but no arms, originally designed as a dining chair), the executive chair (42–45"), and the lounge chair (39", originally with or without arms) and ottoman.

References

External links
Eames Office - vintage
Eames Aluminum Group Brochure, Herman Miller, 1959

Chairs
Works by Charles and Ray Eames
Individual models of furniture